Lagarfljót also called Fljótið  is a river situated in the east of Iceland near Egilsstaðir. The 27 MW Lagarfossvirkjun hydropower station is located at its lower end.

The biggest forest in Iceland, Hallormsstaðaskógur is found near the river as well as a waterfall, Hengifoss. Below it is another waterfall called Litlanesfoss.

As with the Scottish lake Loch Ness, a cryptid serpent, called Lagarfljótsormurinn by locals, is believed by some to live in the depths of Lagarfljót.

See also
List of rivers of Iceland
Waterfalls of Iceland

References

External links
Information and photo
Hallormsstaður und Hengifoss

Rivers of Iceland